Pennelope Althea Beckles-Robinson (born 12 September 1961) is a Trinidad and Tobago attorney and politician. She has served as a Member of Parliament in the House of Representatives for Arima since the 2020 general election. She is the current Minister of Planning and Development. Previously she was the country's Permanent Representative to the United Nations.

Early life and education
Beckles was born on 12 September 1961 in Borde Narve Village, three months before parliament history was created in Trinidad and Tobago growing up without electricity or running water. Her father, Lionel Beckles, worked for the Oilfield Workers' Trade Union and she has four brothers and one sister. She attended St Raphael's Grade School and St Joseph's Convent, San Fernando. She graduated from the University of the West Indies, Barbados and Hugh Wooding Law School.

Career
Beckles has practised as an attorney since 1988, attached to the Chambers of Theodore R Guerra and Associates.

Beckles first entered parliament when she was appointed an opposition Senator for the People's National Movement (PNM) in 1995. She was then elected to the House of Representatives representing the Arima constituency in 2000, serving until 2010. She was appointed Minister for Social Development in 2001, Minister for Culture and Tourism in 2002, and Minister for Public Utilities and the Environment in 2003.

Beckles was Trinidad and Tobago's first female Deputy Speaker of the Parliament from 2007 until 2010 and served as Leader of Opposition Business from 2010 until 2013. In November 2012, she was elected lady vice-chair of the PNM, but she was dropped from the senate by party leader Keith Rowley in December 2013. In May 2014, she unsuccessfully challenged Rowley for the leadership of the party. On 4 February 2015, she was rejected in her bid to represent the PNM for the constituency of Arima in the 2015 general election.

Beckles was appointed Trinidad and Tobago's Permanent Representative to the UN by Prime Minister Rowley in August 2016. She postponed taking up the appointment to attend the funeral of former Prime Minister Patrick Manning in July.

She was appointed as Minister of Planning and Development on 16 March 2022 following a cabinet reshuffle.

Personal life
Beckles married Noel Robinson in December 2008, and she has four stepchildren. She also became the guardian of her ten-year-old niece after her sister Michelle died in 2015.

References

Living people
1961 births
Permanent Representatives of Trinidad and Tobago to the United Nations
Government ministers of Trinidad and Tobago
University of the West Indies alumni
Trinidad and Tobago women lawyers
People's National Movement politicians
Members of the Senate (Trinidad and Tobago)
Members of the House of Representatives (Trinidad and Tobago)
Women government ministers of Trinidad and Tobago
Trinidad and Tobago women diplomats
20th-century Trinidad and Tobago women politicians
20th-century Trinidad and Tobago politicians
21st-century Trinidad and Tobago women politicians
21st-century Trinidad and Tobago politicians
Women ambassadors
20th-century Trinidad and Tobago lawyers
Trinidad and Tobago people of Barbadian descent
Trinidad and Tobago people of Carriacouan descent